Choice 2000 on-line School is California's 64 Charter school. Its real-time online service is provided to students in grades 9–12 in the southern California area.

History
The original concept of this charter school was developed by Michael T. Allen in 1994. Under the California State rules, it received signatures of at least 50% of the teachers of the Perris Lake Continuation School and was submitted to Superintendent Stephen Thiel, and Asst. Superintendents Judy Smith and Donald Sauter. It was submitted and accepted by the California Department of Education in July 1994. It is located in the Perris Union High School District, in Perris, California. It is currently under School District management.

Closure 
In 2014, Choice 2000 On-Line closed its virtual doors and shut down.

References

External links
 www.choice2000.org

Online schools in the United States
Charter high schools in California
Educational institutions established in 1994
Perris, California
1994 establishments in California